Ethel Stephanie Stuckey (born December 25, 1965) is an American businesswoman and former politician from Georgia. She is currently the CEO of Stuckey's Corporation. Stuckey served in the Georgia House of Representatives from 1999 to 2013.

Early life and education 
The daughter of former Georgia Congressman Williamson Sylvester Stuckey, Jr., spent her early life in Washington, D.C. Stuckey attended the University of Georgia and earned a B.A. in French in 1989. In 1992 Stuckey earned a J.D. from the University of Georgia School of Law.

Career 
Stuckey worked as legislative aide and attorney to Georgia Senator Mary Margaret Oliver while building her own practice. In 1998, Stuckey ran her first successful political campaign representing Dekalb County in Georgia's House of Representatives until 2013.

After 14 years in the Georgia House of Representatives, Stuckey announced in 2012 that she would not seek re-election, instead taking a position as  Executive Director of GreenLaw, an environmentally focused law resource center in Atlanta, Georgia.

In 2015, Stuckey was appointed by Atlanta mayor Kasim Reed to be Director of Sustainability for the City of Atlanta and then to the position of Chief Resilience Officer.

In late 2019, Stuckey purchased Stuckey's Corporation - the iconic roadside stop famous for its pecan candies and kitschy souvenirs that her grandfather founded in 1937 - for $500,000 and became the third-generation CEO of the family business.  She stated that the motivating factors for purchasing the company were an emotional attachment to the family brand along with the desire to make Stuckey's both profitable and a household name again. At the time she purchased Stuckey's, the company was operating at a deficit and had only 13 original free-standing stores in 10 states that still sported the signature sloped original teal roofs in addition to around 65 licensed Stuckey's Express store-within-a-store locations.

Within six months, Stuckey restored Stuckey's to profitability, thanks in part to a shift in focus from licensed Stuckey's store locations to the company's classic line of candies. She also expanded the brand back into candy manufacturing with the purchase of a pecan shelling and candy plant in Wrens, Georgia in January 2021. Candy and nut sales have increased to almost 50% of the company’s revenue stream as the brand expands to more national retail locations.

In addition to  a modest store growth and candy manufacturing and sales, Stuckey shared how promoting pecans and supporting the vision of the "great American road trip" are also a vital part of Stuckey's Corporation growth. As a result, Stuckey hopes to eventually own a handful of Stuckey’s interstate stores to revive the original premise behind the company as a “roadside oasis” while continuing to build up the pecan side of the business to secure its future for another 85 years.

References

|-

|-

Living people
University of Georgia alumni
American women chief executives
Democratic Party members of the Georgia House of Representatives
1965 births
20th-century American politicians
20th-century American women politicians
21st-century American politicians
21st-century American women politicians
21st-century American businesspeople
21st-century American businesswomen
Women state legislators in Georgia (U.S. state)